Diaminobutyricibacter tongyongensis is a Gram-positive, mesophilic, rod-shaped and motile species of bacteria from the family Microbacteriaceae.

References

Microbacteriaceae
Bacteria described in 2014
Monotypic bacteria genera